Bayburt University (BU; in Turkish, Bayburt Üniversitesi, commonly referred to as BÜ) is a public research university in the city of Bayburt, Turkey. The research and education conducted by the university has an emphasis on engineering and natural sciences.

The official language of instruction at BU is Turkish.

History
Bayburt University was founded under the city name as a new university in Bayburt, 2008.
(Law no. 5765 Approval Date: 22/05/2008)

This University Includes:

a) The Faculty of Economic and Administrative Sciences, Faculty of Engineering, School of Education

b) A Vocational High School and a School of Higher Health Services,

c) Graduate School (Science Institute and the Institute of Social Sciences)

Second Cycle Programmes (Master's Degree)
Institute of Science
  Mechanical Engineering
  Civil Engineering
  Food Engineering
  Civil Engineering

Institute of Social Sciences
  Elementary Religious Culture and Moral Education
  Business Administration
  Elementary Mathematics Education
  Primary Teacher
  Basic Islamic Sciences
  Business Administration

First Cycle Programmes (Bachelor's Degree)

Bayburt Education Faculty
 Classroom Teaching
 Classroom Teaching S.E.
 Science Teacher
 Science Teacher S.E.
 Elementary Mathematics Education
 Turkish Education

Faculty of Economics and Administrative Sciences
 Economics
 Economics S.E.
 Business Administration
 Business Administration S.E.

Faculty of Engineering
 Mechanical Engineering
 Mechanical Engineering S.E.
 Food Engineering
 Food Engineering S.E.
 Civil Engineering S.E.
 Civil Engineering

Faculty of Theology
 Theology
 Theology S.E.
 Religious Culture and Moral Education
 Religious Culture and Moral Education S.E.
 
Short Cycle Programmes (Associate degree)

Bayburt Vocational School
 Accounting and Taxation S.E.
 Accounting and Taxation
 Office Management and Secretarial
 Marketing and Advertising
 Marketing and Advertising S.E.
 Foreign Trade
 Foreign Trade S.E.
 Chemistry and Chemical Processing Technology
 Chemistry and Chemical Processing Technology S.E.
 Management and Organization
 Management and Organization S.E.
 Computer Technology and Programming S.E.
 Computer Technology and Programming
 Electricity and Energy
 Electricity and Energy S.E.
 Finance, Banking and Insurance
 Finance, Banking and Insurance S.E.
 Finance, Banking and Insurance
 Electronics and Automation S.E.
 Electronics and Automation

Bayburt Vocational School of Health Services
 S.E.

Affiliations
The university is a member of the Caucasus University Association. The University is also the partner of College of Law in Wroclaw.

References

 

Universities and colleges in Turkey
State universities and colleges in Turkey
Bayburt Province
Educational institutions established in 2008
Buildings and structures in Bayburt Province
2008 establishments in Turkey